Jasleen Dhamija (born 1933-2023 ) is an Indian textile art historian, crafts expert and former UN worker. Based in Delhi, she is best known for her pioneering research on the handloom and handicraft industry, especially history of textiles and costumes. She has remained professor of living cultural traditions at the University of Minnesota. Over the years, during her career as a textile revivalist and scholar, she has authored several books on textiles, including Sacred Textiles of India (2014).

Early life and background
Dhamija grew up in Abbotabad, in the North Western Frontier Province, before her family migrated to Delhi in 1940, where they lived in Khyber Pass locality of Civil Lines, Delhi, and graduated from Miranda House, University of Delhi.

Career
She started her career in 1954,  with culture and craft revivalist Kamaladevi Chattopadhyay in the Government of India, and started working on craft revival, community development and women's employment. In the 1960s, she worked with the Handicrafts Board of India, next she started working with artisans directly in rural area, this in time lead to her work with the UN developing self-help programmes for women in war-torn Balkan countries.

Over the years, she has curated several textile and crafts exhibitions. Besides several books, on crafts and textile, she has also written two cookbooks, including Joy of Vegetarian Cooking (2000). In 2007, she published a biography of Kamaladevi Chattopadhyay and her role in the revival of the arts and crafts in modern India.

She has remained faculty at the National Institute of Fashion Technology, New Delhi, where she taught History of Indian Textiles and costumes.

Works

References 

1933 births
Living people
Textile arts of India
Indian art historians
People from Abbottabad
Delhi University alumni
Cultural historians
Indian social sciences writers
Cookbook writers
University of Minnesota faculty
20th-century Indian historians
Indian women historians
20th-century Indian women writers
20th-century Indian women scientists
Educators from Delhi
Vegetarian cookbook writers
Women educators from Delhi
Writers from Delhi
Women writers from Delhi
Indian art writers
20th-century Indian non-fiction writers
Historians of Indian art
20th-century Indian social scientists
21st-century Indian social scientists
21st-century Indian women writers
21st-century Indian writers
Textile historians